Omeria McDonald Scott (born November 21, 1956) is an American politician and a member of the Democratic Party. She is a member of the Mississippi House of Representatives from the 80th District and was first elected in 1992.

References

1956 births
Living people
People from Laurel, Mississippi
Democratic Party members of the Mississippi House of Representatives
African-American state legislators in Mississippi
African-American women in politics
21st-century American politicians
21st-century American women politicians
University of Southern Mississippi alumni
21st-century African-American women
21st-century African-American politicians
20th-century African-American people
Candidates in the 2018 United States Senate elections
20th-century African-American women